The 29th Acrobatic Gymnastics European Championships was held in Holon, Israel from October 30 to November 3, 2019. The competition took place at the Holon Toto Hall.  This was the first time that Israel has hosted an acrobatic gymnastics competition at an international level.

Participating nations

 
 
 
 
 
 
 
 
 
 
 
 
 
  (Juniors only)

Schedule
 Wednesday, October 30
13:30-14:00 Opening Ceremony
14:00-16:05 Junior Qualifications - Mixed Pair (Balance) / Women's Group (Dynamic)
16:15-17:50 Junior Qualifications - Men's Pair (Balance) / Men's Group (Balance) / Woman Pair (Dynamic)
18:30–19:25 Junior Finals - Mixed Pair (Balance) / Women's Group (Dynamic)
19:30–20:35 Junior Finals - Men's Pair (Balance) / Men's Group (Balance) / Woman Pair (Dynamic) 
20:40–21:05 Award Ceremony
 Thursday, October 31
15:30-16:55 Senior Qualifications - Mixed Pair (Balance) / Women's Group (Dynamic)
17:10-18:20 Senior Qualifications - Women's Pair (Balance) / Men's Group (Balance) / Men Pair (Dynamic)
19:00–19:55 Senior Finals - Mixed Pair (Balance) / Women's Group (Dynamic)
20:00–21.00 Senior Finals - Women's Pair (Balance) / Men's Group (Balance) / Men Pair (Dynamic) 
21:00–21:25 Award Ceremony
 Friday, November 1
11:00-13:10 Junior Qualifications - Mixed Pair (Dynamic) / Women's Group (Balance)
14:30-16:05 Junior Qualifications - Men's Pair (Dynamic) / Men's Group (Dynamic) / Woman Pair (Balance)
16:20-17:45 Senior Qualifications - Mixed Pair (Dynamic) / Women's Groups (Balance)
18:00-19:05 Senior Qualifications - Women's Pair (Dynamic) / Men's Groups (Dynamic) / Men Pairs (Balance)
 Saturday, November 2
14:00-15:40 Junior All Around (Combined) Finals - Mixed Pair & Women's Group
15:55-17:15 Junior All Around (Combined) Finals - Men's Pair, Men's Group & Women's Pair 
17:20-17:45 Award Ceremony
18:00-19:20 Senior All Around Finals (Combined) - Mixed Pair & Women's Group
19:30-20:35 Senior All Around Finals (Combined) - Men's Pair, Men's Group & Women's Pair 
20:40-21:05 Award Ceremony
 Sunday, November 3
14:00-14:55 Juniors Individual Finals - Mixed pair (Dynamic) / Women's Group (Balance)
15:00-16:05 Juniors Individual Finals - Men's Pair (Dynamic) / Men's Group (Dynamic) / Women's Pair (Balance)
16:10-16:35 Award Ceremony
17:00-17:55 Seniors Individual Finals - Mixed Pair (Dynamic) / Women's Group (Balance)
18:00-18:55 Seniors Individual Finals - Woman Pair (Dynamic) / Men's Group (Dynamic) / Men's Pair (Balance)
19:00-19:25 Award Ceremony
19:25-19:45 Closing Ceremony

Medal winners

Senior

Junior

Medal table

References

External links
 
 2019 European Championships in Acrobatic Gymnastics at EuropeanGymnastics.com

European Acrobatics Championships
2019 in gymnastics
2019 in Israeli sport